Megan Park (born July 24, 1986) is a Canadian actress and director. She is known for her portrayal of Grace Bowman in the television series The Secret Life of the American Teenager. In 2021, Park made her feature directorial debut with The Fallout, which won three awards at South by Southwest and was later released on HBO Max.

Early life
Born in Lindsay, Ontario, Park began her acting career with small parts starting at age 6. She attended Oakridge Secondary School, in London, Ontario. She was also a part of the Original Kids Theatre program.

Career

Acting
Her first major roles came with a guest spot on the Lifetime series Angela's Eyes and a minor role in the indie movie Charlie Bartlett.

Park completed a guest starring role on the popular Disney channel Family show Life with Derek as Amy, a love interest of Derek and head cheerleader ex-girlfriend to Max. Her largest role to date has been in the ABC Family series The Secret Life of the American Teenager, where she plays one of the main characters, Grace Bowman, a conservative Christian teen and cheerleader who, along with her boyfriend, struggle with her purity vow until marriage.

In 2013, Park lost the role of Nicki in the sitcom Undateable to Briga Heelan. Heelan had originally been cast in the role but was believed to be unable to continue when her sitcom Ground Floor was renewed for a second season. The part was recast with Park, however when Heelan's schedule was adjusted to allow her to appear on both shows, Heelan took back the role.

In 2014, Park portrayed Jules in the horror-thriller film Demonic, directed by Will Canon.

In 2015, Park portrayed Lindsay in the Hallmark Channel movie A Wish Come True, directed by Mark Rosman.

Music
In 2009, Park and singer Codi Caraco formed a band called Frank and Derol, in which she sang and played bass guitar.

In 2010, Park left the band to focus on her acting career. Park also appeared, together with Tyler Hilton, in a music video called "(Kissed You) Good Night" recorded by American country music group Gloriana.

Personal life
In July 2006, Park started dating American actor and singer Tyler Hilton after meeting him on the set of Charlie Bartlett. They became engaged in December 2013 and married on October 10, 2015. On December 20, 2019, they welcomed a daughter.

Filmography

Film

Television

Music videos

Director

References

External links
 
 Megan Park Online (archive)

1986 births
21st-century Canadian actresses
Actresses from Ontario
Canadian child actresses
Canadian film actresses
Female music video directors
Film directors from Ontario
Canadian television actresses
Living people
People from Kawartha Lakes
Canadian women film directors